Marcos Faundez-Zanuy (born 1969 in Barcelona, Spain) is full professor and the Dean at Escuela Universitaria Politécnica de Mataró (Polytechnic University of Catalonia). He has a Phd on Telecommunication from UPC.
He was the chair of the European COST action 277 "Non-linear Speech Processing", as well as the secretary of COST-2102 "Cross-Modal Analysis of Verbal and Non-verbal Communication"

Books Edited in English
 	45th IEEE Carnahan conference on security Technology. Edited by Marcos Faundez-Zanuy, Virginia Espinosa & Larry Sanson. 368 pages, IEEE Catalog Number: CFP11ICR-PRT, .
 	Encyclopedia of Artificial Intelligence Edited By: Juan R. Rabuñal; Julian Dorado; Alejandro Pazos Sierra author of the chapter “Biometric security technology”. pp. 262–269,  IGI Global
 	Advances in Nonlinear Speech Processing and applications. Editors: Gérard Chollet, Anna Esposito, Marcos Faundez-Zanuy & Maria Marinaro. Springer Verlag LNCS Vol. 3445. 433 pages. .
 	“Nonlinear analyses and algorithms for speech processing” Lecture Notes in Computer Science LNCS 3817. . . Editors: Marcos Faundez-Zanuy, Léonard Janer, Ana Esposito, Antonio Satue, Josep Roure, Virginia Espinosa. 380 pages. January 2006.
 	Progress in Nonlinear speech processing. Editors: Yannis Stylianou, Marcos Faundez-Zanuy & Anna Esposito. Springer Verlag LNCS Vol. 4391. 269pages.  May 2007.
 	Verbal and Nonverbal Commun. Behaviours, LNAI vol. 4775 Editors: A. Esposito, M. Faundez-Zanuy, E. Keller 2007. Lecture Notes in Artificial Intelligence 325 p. Springer. 
 	Biometric ID Management and Multimodal Communication Joint COST 2101 and 2102 International Conference, BioID_MultiComm 2009, Madrid, Spain, September 16–18, 2009, Proceedings Series: Lecture Notes in Computer Science  Subseries: Image Processing, Computer Vision, Pattern Recognition, and Graphics, Vol. 5707  Editors: Fierrez, J.; Ortega-Garcia, J.; Esposito, A.; Drygajlo, A.; Faundez-Zanuy, M. 2009, XIII, 358 p., Softcover . September 2009

References 

1969 births
Living people
Academic staff of the Polytechnic University of Catalonia
People from Barcelona
Polytechnic University of Catalonia alumni